Joseph James Arvay,  (March 18, 1949December 7, 2020) was a Canadian lawyer who argued numerous landmark cases involving civil liberties and constitutional rights.

Early life and education
He was born in Welland, Ontario in 1949. As a law student in 1969, he was involved in a skiing accident which left him a paraplegic. He graduated from the University of Western Ontario with a Bachelor of Laws in 1974. He then attained a Master of Laws from Harvard Law School.

Career 
Arvay initially pursued an academic career, teaching law at the University of Windsor. In 1981 he moved to British Columbia where he practiced in the Ministry of Attorney General. He was appointed Queen's Counsel after only ten years at the bar, shocking many with his youth.  In 1989 he started the boutique law firm Arvay Finlay with John Finlay, Q.C. and Murray Rankin.  After Finlay's death and Rankin's entry into politics, Arvay joined the firm of Farris, Vaughan, Wills & Murphy LLP in January 2014.  In October 2017, Arvay left Farris and rejoined former associates Mark Underhill, Catherine Boies Parker, Robin Gage and Alison Latimer in the newly reconstituted Arvay Finlay LLP.

Notable cases

Safe injection

In 2011, he argued the case for the Insite safe injection site and whether it falls under provincial or federal jurisdiction. "Insite is a life-raft for the people in the Downtown Eastside," Arvay told the court. "A life-raft in a sea of misery.". On Sept 30th 2011 Canada's Supreme Court ruled that North America's only legal drug injection facility can stay open. The top court issued its 9-0 unanimous decision in a case that has drawn international attention. "The battle for other sites across Canada remains to be fought," Arvay said, adding the ruling will give those cities hope. "Insite is going to remain open no matter what."

Assisted suicide
Arvay worked with the BC Civil Liberties Association in a successful fight to decriminalize assisted suicide. At the British Columbia Supreme Court, he contended the law removes a person's right to make decisions about their body and also restricts physicians' freedom to administer compassionate end-of-life care. On June 15, 2012, the British Columbia Supreme Court declared a section of the Criminal Code that prohibits physician-assisted death invalid. Madam Justice Lynn Smith says the Criminal Code provisions "unjustifiably infringe the equality rights" of the plaintiffs in the case, including Gloria Taylor, who suffers from amyotrophic lateral sclerosis (ALS).

Sperm donors
Arvay recently represented the plaintiff in a landmark case granting children of sperm donors the same rights regarding access to information about their birth parents as adopted children. Joseph Arvay stated that "this case represents a monumental victory for our client, Olivia Pratten, and all the donor offspring she represents who have for too long been disadvantaged by their exclusion from the legislative landscape which has promoted and perpetuated prejudice and stereotyping and caused them grave harm."

Sex workers
Representatives for Vancouver sex workers argued before the Supreme Court of Canada on January 19, 2012, that a constitutional challenge to Canada's sex work laws should be allowed to proceed. Arvay, who spoke for SWUAV on Jan 19, indicated that the legal barriers and potential personal consequences facing street-level sex workers deter individuals from participating in such a challenge, leaving it up to groups like SWUAV to coordinate public interest cases. He said these consequences include fear of retaliation by police, invasion of privacy and child welfare actions. "For them, this case is not about vindicating some abstract constitutional principle but, rather, to be able to carry on what is otherwise lawful, legal sex work in a manner that will not cause them grievous bodily harm or even death," Arvay said during the proceedings. "Willy Pickton had his day in court; my clients want theirs, too."

Landmark cases 

Arvay has defended high-profile cases such as the Little Sisters' Book Store trial, where he argued gay and lesbian rights in the context of freedom of speech. He was also involved in the APEC inquiry that tested the Charter of Rights and Freedoms and the role government has, and does not have, in censoring the public's inherent right to speak out on matters of political importance.

Andrews v Law Society 

Andrews v Law Society of British Columbia, [1989] 1 SCR 143 is the first Supreme Court of Canada case to deal with equality rights of the Canadian Charter of Rights and Freedoms (Section 15). Arvay was the appellant for the Attorney General of British Columbia. The Court held that the Law Society's rule violated section 15 and it could not be saved under section 1.

Egan v Canada 
Egan v Canada, [1995] was one of a trilogy of equality rights cases published by a very divided Supreme Court of Canada in the spring of 1995. In this case Arvay was counsel for the plaintiffs James Egan and John Norris Nesbit. It stands today as a landmark Supreme Court case which established that sexual orientation constitutes a prohibited basis of discrimination under Section 15 of the Canadian Charter of Rights and Freedoms.

Chamberlain v Surrey School District No. 36 
Arvay was counsel in the Supreme Court of Canada for Chamberlain v Surrey School District No. 36 where he successfully argued that a local school board could not impose its religious values by refusing to permit the use of books in K-1 that sought to promote tolerance of same-sex relationships.

Genetic Fairness 
Reference by Quebec to the Court of Appeal of Quebec concerning the constitutionality of the Genetic Non-Discrimination Act, 2020 SCC 17. Acted for the appellant, Canadian Coalition for Genetic Fairness, in an appeal to declare that the GNDA is a valid exercise of Parliament's power to enact criminal law pursuant to section 91(27) of the Constitution Act, 1867.

Public Access to Records Given Under a Confidential and Private Process 
Canada v. Fontaine, 2017 SCC 47. Acted for the Chief Adjudicator Indian Residential Schools Adjudication Secretariat in regard to whether records of the Indian Residential Schools Settlement Agreement remain confidential or are under the control of a government institution under the Access to Information Act, the Library and Archives of Canada Act and the Privacy Act.

Damages for Wrongful Conviction 
Henry v. British Columbia, 2015 SCC 24. Acted for the plaintiff/appellant Henry, who successfully brought a section 24 Charter claim for damages arising from prosecutorial misconduct absent proof of malice and wrongful conviction for almost 27 years.

Right to Physician-Assisted Death 
Carter v. Canada, 2015 SCC 5. Acted for the plaintiffs/appellants in their successful fight to decriminalize assisted suicide. At the British Columbia Supreme Court, Arvay contended the law removes a person's right to make decisions about their body and also restricts physicians’ freedom to administer compassionate end-of-life care.

Right to Strike 
Saskatchewan Federation of Labour v. Saskatchewan, 2015 SCC 4. Acted for the interveners the British Columbia Teachers’ Federation and the Hospital Employees’ Union, in support of the Federation of Labour's constitutional right to strike.

Right to Security of Person 
Canada v. Bedford, 2013 SCC 72. Acted for the intervenors Pivot Legal Society and others in support of Ms. Bedford's Charter challenge to Canada's prostitution laws.

Canada v. Downtown Eastside 
Sex Workers United Against Violence Society, 2012 SCC 45. Acted for the respondents, representatives for Vancouver sex workers, on a Charter challenge that Canada's sex work laws should be allowed to proceed. Arvay stated that the legal barriers and potential personal consequences facing street-level sex workers deter individuals from participating in such a challenge, leaving it up to groups like SWUAV to coordinate public interest cases.

Access to Medical Information of Sperm Donors 
Pratten v. BC, 2012 BCCA 480. Acted for the plaintiff/respondent in her bid to grant children of sperm donors the same rights regarding access to medical information about their birth parents as adopted children.

Safe Injection Site 
PHS Community Services Society v. Canada, 2011 SCC 44. Acted for the plaintiffs/respondents Insite safe injection site. The Supreme Court of Canada ruled that North America's only legal drug injection facility can stay open. The top court issued its 9-0 unanimous decision in a case that had drawn international attention. Over 100 supervised safe injection sites have since been opened in cities around the world.

Charter Rights of Guantanamo Bay Detainees 
Canada v. Khadr, 2010 SCC 3. Acted for the intervener, the British Columbia Civil Liberties Association, for a declaration that Omar Khadr's Charter rights were violated by detention at Guantanamo Bay.

Constitutionality of Provincial Tax 
Vander Zalm v. British Columbia, 2010 BCSC 1320; see also 2010 BCSC 1174. Acted for the petitioner, former Premier of the Province of BC, in his challenge that the Harmonized Sales Tax was unconstitutional.

Freedom of Association to Bargain Collectively: Health Services and Support 
Facilities Subsector Bargaining Assn. v. British Columbia, 2007 SCC 27. Acted for the plaintiffs in their successful Charter challenge that the Health and Social Services Delivery Improvement Act violated their constitutional rights to freedom of association including the procedural right to collective bargaining.

Advance Costs 
Little Sisters Book and Art Emporium v. Canada (Commissioner of Customs and Revenue), 2007 SCC 2. Acted for the plaintiff/appellant refining the law of advance costs by the granting of a public interest advance costs order.

Same-Sex Marriage 
Reference re Same-Sex Marriage, 2004 SCC 79. Acted for the interveners, Egale Canada Inc. and others, in their successful challenge that a federal proposed Act that marriage for civil purposes is the lawful union of two persons to exclusion of all others. Freedom of religion (protecting religious officials from being compelled by state to perform same-sex marriage contrary to their religious beliefs) is protected.

Freedom of Expression and Power of School Board 
Chamberlain v. Surrey School District No. 36, 2002 SCC 86. Acted the petitioners/appellants in their successful argument that a local school board could not impose its religious values by refusing to permit the use of books in K-1 that sought to promote tolerance of same-sex relationships.

Equality Rights and Freedom of Expression 
Little Sisters Book and Art Emporium v. Canada (Minister of Justice), 2000 SCC 69. Acted for the plaintiff, a gay and lesbian bookstore, in their successful Charter challenge for freedom of expression and equality rights in respect of Customs officials wrongly delaying, confiscating or prohibiting materials imported by bookstore on numerous occasions under the Customs Act.

Aboriginal Title 
Delgamuukw v. British Columbia, [1997] 3 SCR 1010. Acted for the respondent/appellant on the cross-appeal, Her Majesty the Queen in Right of the Province of British Columbia in this seminal case on aboriginal title and section 35 of the Constitution Act, 1982.

Recognition 
In 2000, he was awarded the Walter S. Tarnopolsky Human Rights Award; described by Madam Justice Michèle Rivet as "one of Canada's most tireless civil rights and human rights lawyers ... He has made a exceptional commitment to human rights in this country."  He was voted one of Canadian Lawyer's Top 25 Most Influential in 2010, 2011 & 2012 by Canadian Lawyer Magazine. Peter Gzowski puts it as follows: "[Arvay] has had a remarkable role in shaping how our Constitution is interpreted".

On March 18, 2014, he received the McGill University Centre for Human Rights and Legal Pluralism's 2014 Robert S. Litvack Award, and gave a conference titled "Litigating Charter Challenges: Stories of a Constitutional Lawyer."

In 2016, Arvay was awarded with an honorary Doctor of Laws degree from York University, Osgoode Hall Law School, and in 2018 was awarded the same honour by the University of Victoria. In 2017, he became an Officer of the Order of Canada, one of Canada's most prestigious civilian honours, and in 2018, was awarded the Order of British Columbia, the highest form of recognition the Province can extend to its citizens.

Death 
Arvay died on December 7, 2020, after a heart attack. He was honoured with tributes from the Attorney General of British Columbia, the Chief Justice of Canada, and the British Columbia Civil Liberties Association, among others.

References

External links 
 Arvay declares HST unconstitutional

Lawyers in Ontario
People from Welland
1949 births
2020 deaths
Harvard Law School alumni
University of Western Ontario alumni
Officers of the Order of Canada